Matjaž Markič (born 12 January 1983 in Koper) is a male breaststroke swimmer from Slovenia, who won the gold medal in the men's 50 m breaststroke event at the 2008 European SC Championships in Rijeka. He represented his native country at the 2008 Summer Olympics in Beijing, PR China, finishing in 24th place in the men's 100 m breaststroke.

References
 Profile

1983 births
Living people
Slovenian male swimmers
Male breaststroke swimmers
Olympic swimmers of Slovenia
Swimmers at the 2008 Summer Olympics
Sportspeople from Koper
European Aquatics Championships medalists in swimming

Mediterranean Games bronze medalists for Slovenia
Swimmers at the 2005 Mediterranean Games
Mediterranean Games medalists in swimming